

Waermund (or Wærmund) was a medieval Bishop of Rochester. He was consecrated between 845 and 868. He died between 845 and 868.

Citations

References

External links
 

Bishops of Rochester
9th-century English bishops